Philippe Marquis  (born May 9, 1989) is a Canadian freestyle skier. He is the brother of mogulist Vincent Marquis. Marquis represented Canada at the 2014 Winter Olympics in the men's moguls event.

References

External links
 
 Freestyle Canada profile (accessed February 2014)
 Canada Olympic Committee profile (accessed February 2014)

1989 births
Living people
Canadian male freestyle skiers
Skiers from Quebec City
Freestyle skiers at the 2014 Winter Olympics
Freestyle skiers at the 2018 Winter Olympics
Olympic freestyle skiers of Canada